Hatley, Quebec may refer to:

Hatley, Quebec (historic township), the historic township that led to the creation of :
Hatley, Quebec (municipality), an unqualified municipality
Hatley, Quebec (township), a nearby township municipality

See also
North Hatley, Quebec